Hasta que perdió Jalisco ("Until He Lost Jalisco") is a 1945 Mexican film. It was directed by 
Fernando de Fuentes.

External links
 

1940s Spanish-language films
Films directed by Fernando de Fuentes
Mexican black-and-white films
Mexican musical films
1945 musical films
1940s Mexican films